Janian is a village in Shaheed Bhagat Singh Nagar district of Punjab State, India. The village is administrated by Sarpanch an elected representative of the village.

Demography 
As of 2011, Janian has a total number of 126 houses and population of 604 of which 314 include are males while 290 are females according to the report published by Census India in 2011. The literacy rate of Janian is 83.14%, higher than the state average of 75.84%. The population of children under the age of 6 years is 76 which is 12.58% of total population of Janian, and child sex ratio is approximately 551 as compared to Punjab state average of 846.

Most of the people are from Schedule Caste which constitutes 58.11% of total population in Janian. The town does not have any Schedule Tribe population so far.

As per the report published by Census India in 2011, 201 people were engaged in work activities out of the total population of Janian which includes 171 males and 30 females. According to census survey report 2011, 59.70% workers describe their work as main work and 40.30% workers are involved in Marginal activity providing livelihood for less than 6 months.

Education 
KC Engineering College and Doaba Khalsa Trust Group Of Institutions are the nearest colleges.

List of schools nearby:
K.C. Public School, Nawanshahr
Govt. Senior Secondary School, Haila
Rayat Institute Of Engineering & Technology, Railmajra
Guru Teg Bahadur Model School, Behram
Sandhu Institute Of Nursing, Mahalon

Transport 

See also 
List of villages in India

References

External links 
 Tourism of Punjab
 Census of Punjab
 Locality Based PINCode

Villages in Shaheed Bhagat Singh Nagar district